The fifth season of Beverly Hills, 90210, an American teen drama television series aired from September 7, 1994 on Fox and concluded on May 24, 1995 after 32 episodes. 

The season aired Wednesday nights at 8/9c in the United States averaging 14.7 million viewers a week and was released on DVD in 2008.

This is the first season for Tiffani Amber Thiessen as Valerie Malone and the last season for Gabrielle Carteris, Mark Damon Espinoza, Carol Potter and James Eckhouse as series regulars.

Overview
This season follows the gang during their sophomore year in college as they struggle with issues such as relationships, financial problems, dysfunctional families, parenthood, drug abuse, politics, injuries, self image, sexual assault, domestic violence, and cults. The West Bev group starts their sophomore year of college, but like always problems always arise before the school year begins. Dylan returns to his old habits after being duped out of all of his money, which may cost him his life. With Brenda in London, the Walshes welcome an old family friend from Boston, Valorie Malone, who is looking for a fresh start following a traumatic occurrence at home. Brandon and Kelly take their new relationship public, but when outside influences such as new responsibility, grooming, and old feelings begin to show, their new relationship is put in jepordy.

Cast

Starring
Jason Priestley as Brandon Walsh  
Jennie Garth as Kelly Taylor  
Ian Ziering as Steve Sanders  
Gabrielle Carteris as Andrea Zuckerman-Vasquez  
Luke Perry as Dylan McKay
Brian Austin Green as David Silver  
Tori Spelling as Donna Martin  
Mark Damon Espinoza as Jesse Vasquez 
Tiffani Thiessen as Valerie Malone  
Carol Potter as Cindy Walsh  
James Eckhouse as Jim Walsh

Recurring
Joe E. Tata as Nat Bussichio 
Kathleen Robertson as Clare Arnold  
Jamie Walters as Ray Pruit  
Ann Gillespie as Jackie Taylor 
Christine Elise as Emily Valentine 
Nicholas Pryor as Chancellor Milton Arnold
Denise Dowse as Vice Principal Yvonne Teasley
Jed Allan as Rush Sanders 
Casper Van Dien as Griffin Stone
Jeffery King as Charley Rollins 
James C. Victor as Peter Tucker 
Alan Toy as Professor Patrick Finley 
Ryan Thomas Brown as Muntz

Episodes

Soundtrack
Beverly Hills, 90210: The College Years was released as season five was airing, with several songs from it featured in the show's closing credits.

Ratings

Home media
The DVD release of season five was released in Regions 1, 2 and 4. Unlike other season releases, it has no special features. The season is also available on CBS All Access, however, episodes 12, 20 and 25 are missing due to copyright permissions.

References

1994 American television seasons
1995 American television seasons
Beverly Hills, 90210 seasons